Rochester Airport may refer to:

 Greater Rochester International Airport (ICAO: KROC) in Rochester, New York, United States
 Rochester International Airport (ICAO: KRST) in Rochester, Minnesota, United States
 Rochester Airport, England (ICAO: EGTO) in Rochester, Kent, England, United Kingdom